, also known as NIB, is a television network headquartered in Nagasaki Prefecture, Japan.  Nagasaki International Television is the fourth commercial television broadcaster in Nagasaki, it is affiliated with NNN / NNS.  NTV Holdings and Fuji Media Holdings are the main shareholders of Nagasaki International Television. 

NIB founded in 1990, and started broadcasting 1991. 
 In 2006, NIB started digital television broadcasting.  The headquarter of NIB is located in Dejima, its VOD service also named as DEJIMA ch.

References

External links
 Official website 

Nippon News Network
Television stations in Japan
Nagasaki Prefecture
Television channels and stations established in 1990